In Greek mythology, Lycorias (Ancient Greek: Λυκωριάς) was the "yellow haired" Nereid, one of the fifty marine-nymph daughters of 'Old Man of the Sea' Nereus and the Oceanid Doris.

Mythology 
Lycorias was mentioned by Virgil as one of the nymphs in the train of Cyrene"But from her chamber in the river depth the mother heard his cry. Around her the Nymphs carded Milesian fleeces stained with rich sea-dyes, Drymo and Xantho, Ligea and Phyllodoce, their bright tresses falling loose over their snowy necks; and Cydippe and golden-haired Lycorias, the one a maiden, the other even then knowing the first throes of travail; and Clio and Beroë her sister, both daughters of Ocean, both"
Nereids

Notes

References 

 Gaius Julius Hyginus, Fabulae from The Myths of Hyginus translated and edited by Mary Grant. University of Kansas Publications in Humanistic Studies. Online version at the Topos Text Project.
 Publius Vergilius Maro, Bucolics, Aeneid, and Georgics of Vergil. J. B. Greenough. Boston. Ginn & Co. 1900. Online version at the Perseus Digital Library.